Bahman Motamedian (born 2 July) is an Iranian film maker, photographer, writer and script writer. He was born in Tehran, Iran. Motamedian belongs to the so-called "new wave" of Iranian cinema. 
Bahman Motamedian is also has been involved in over twenty works, including shorts film, documentaries film, video art and theater.
Motamedian made his first feature film, titled "Khastegi" ("Sex My Life" aka "Tedium") in 2008. "Khastegi" (Sex My Life) was shown in the official selection of 65th Venice International Film Festival as the "surprise film" in 2008.

Filmography

Screen Writing

Screen Writing for Television Series
Four Homes [Title in Persian: Chahar Khoone] (2007–2008)
Nights in Barareh [Title in Persian: Shabhaye Barareh] (2005)
Dots [Title in Persian: Noghtechin] (2005)
Do Not Enter [Title in Persian: Vorod Mamno, Mamno] (2004)
Under the City Sky [Title in Persian: Zire Asemane Shahr] (2003)
Untitled [Title in Persian: Bedone Sharh] (2002)
Empyrean Police [Title in Persian: Polise Asemani] (2001)
Number 14 [Title in Persian: Pelake 14] (2000)
Magic Light [Title in Persian: Cheraghe Jadou] (2000)
Eternal Train [Title in Persian: Ghatare Abadi] (2000)

Awards and nominations
Awards the first prize			 (24th Torino GBLT Film Festival 23–3 April 2009 / Torino, Italy)
Special citation (Best producer)		(Asia Pacific Festival of 1st Films/ 4–10 December 2008/ Singapore)
Brian Prize					(65th Venice International Film Festival / 27 August to 6 September 2008)
Queer Lion Award 	(65th Venice International Film Festival / 27 August to 6 September 2008)
The Best Experimental Film /Aquarium /( / 13–19 June 2003/Ebensee, Austria)
Silver Bear /Aquarium /(Festival of Nations / 13–19 June 2003/Ebensee, Austria)

"Aquarium" has been screened at
Sonar International Short Film Festival (April 2006 /Florence – Italy)
3rd International Festival Signes de Nuit (25–30 April 2005 /Paris)
Rencontres International Paris/Berlin (18–28 February 2003/Paris)
 (13–19 June 2003 /Ebensee, Austria)
Rencontres International Paris/Berlin (10–22 November 2003/berlin)
Victoria Independent Film & Video Festival (1-10 February 2002/Canada)
25th Open Air Film fest WEITERSTAD (16–20 August 2001/Germany)
2nd IndieKINO International film festival (July2001/Seoul, Korea)
Ajijic International film festival (7–11 November 2001/Mexico)
Kansas City film festival (7–14 April/U.S.A)

"Khastegi" (Sex My Life) has been screened at
 24th BFI London Lesbian & Gay Film Festival (BFI) ( 17–31 March 2010/ London, England)
 Cinema Digital Seoul Film Festival (CinDi) ( 19–25 August 2009 / Seoul, South Korea)
 Chelsea Art Museum (15 July – 19 August 2009 / New York City)
 19th Toronto LGBT Film Festival (14–24 May 2009 / Toronto, Ontario, Canada)
 24th Torino GBLT Film Festival (23–3 April 2009 / Torino, Italy)
 Prague international Film Festival (FEBIOFEST) (26 March-3 April 2009 / Prague, Czech Republic)
 International Contemporary Film Festival (FICCO) (17 Feb – 1 Mar 2009 / Mexico, Mexico City)
 Asia Pacific Festival of 1st Films (4–10 December 2008 / Singapore)
 Festival of 3 Continents, Nantes (22 November – 2 December 2008 / Nantes, French)
 Sao Paulo Film Festival (17–30 October 2008 / São Paulo, Brazil)
  Venice Film Festival (27 August – 6 September 2008 / Venice, Italy)

Play Directing/ Stage Directing
Eugène Ionesco's play The Bald Soprano (2013) /Tehran
Eugène Ionesco's play Jack, or the Submission (1997) /Tehran
Eugène Ionesco's play Maid to Marry (1997) /Tehran
Eugène Ionesco's play The Bald Soprano (1997) /Tehran
Eugène Ionesco's play The Bald Soprano (1995) /Tehran

Published Stories
The Big Overcoat (2010) /Short Story Collection
The Sound of Train Whistling (1999) /Short Story

Solo Exhibition
Niyavaran Cafe Art Gallery /Photography /2007 /Tehran

Group Exhibition
Youth Cinéma Institute /Photography /1991 /Tehran

Educational-backgrounds
Tehran Azad University /Master of Play Directing /1996-1997 /Tehran
Tehran Azad University /Bachelor of Industrial Engineering	/1995 /Tehran
Studying Theatre for two years and joining to /1994 /Tehran
Experimental Theater Institute			
Art University	/Film Directing Major /1992-1994 /Tehran
Studying Photography at Youth Cinema Institute	/1990 /Tehran
and working as a Professional Photographer				
High School Diploma /1989 /Tehran

See also
Intellectual movements in Iran
Iranian New Wave (cinema)
Cinema of Iran
Humanitarianism

References

External links

Khastegi (Sex My Life) official web site

Iranian film directors
Iranian screenwriters
Iranian documentary filmmakers
Iranian photographers
Persian-language film directors
People from Tehran
1969 births
Living people
Iranian male short story writers